Batocera sumbaensis is a species of beetle in the family Cerambycidae. It was described by Franz in 1972. It is known from Sumba Island.

References

Batocerini
Beetles described in 1972